Fred Foggie (born June 10, 1969) is a former American football defensive back. He played for the Cleveland Browns in 1992 and for the Pittsburgh Steelers in 1994.

References

1969 births
Living people
People from Laurens County, South Carolina
Players of American football from South Carolina
American football defensive backs
Minnesota Golden Gophers football players
Birmingham Fire players
Cleveland Browns players
Pittsburgh Steelers players
Frankfurt Galaxy players